Halesia tetraptera, commonly known as the common silverbell or mountain silverbell (or Carolina silverbell; syn. Halesia carolina auct. non L.), is a species in the family Styracaceae, native to the southeastern United States. It is cultivated as an ornamental tree.

Description
It is a small deciduous tree growing to 10 m tall. The leaves are ovate to lanceolate, 5–16 cm long and 4–7 cm broad. The flowers are 1–2.5 cm long, with a four-lobed white corolla. The fruit is a dry drupe 4 cm long, with four wings running along its length.

Range
The species is found in scattered populations over much of the eastern United States, as far north as West Virginia, south to northern Florida, and west to Oklahoma. But it is thinly distributed over much of its native range, and is becoming rare in many areas.

Varieties
There are two varieties of H. tetraptera: 
 Halesia tetraptera var. tetraptera – Common silverbell
 Halesia tetraptera var. monticola (Rehder) Reveal & Seldin – Mountain silverbell

The last taxon is much larger, up to 20–39 m tall, with larger leaves up to 20 cm long and flowers up to 3 cm long.

Ecology 
H. tetraptera var. tetraptera has been marked as a pollinator plant, supporting and attracting butterflies and bees.

References

tetraptera
Trees of the Northeastern United States
Trees of the North-Central United States
Trees of the Southern United States
Trees of the Southeastern United States
Trees of the Great Lakes region (North America)
Flora of the Appalachian Mountains
Natural history of the Great Smoky Mountains
Flora without expected TNC conservation status